The 1966 All-Big Eight Conference football team consists of American football players chosen by various organizations for All-Big Eight Conference teams for the 1966 NCAA University Division football season.  The selectors for the 1966 season included the Associated Press (AP).

Offensive selections

Ends
 Eppie Barney, Iowa State (AP)
 Ben Hart, Oklahoma (AP)

Tackles
 Ed Hall, Oklahoma,  (AP)
 J. B. Christian, Oklahoma State (AP)

Guards
 John Beard, Colorado (AP)
 LaVerne Allers, Nebraska (AP)

Centers
 Kelly Peterson, Nebraska (AP)

Backs
 Bob Churchich, Nebraska (AP)
 Cornelius Davis, Kansas State (AP)
 Wilmer Crooks, Colorado (AP)

Defensive selections

Defensive ends
 Bill Fairband, Colorado (AP)
 Dan Schuppan, Missouri (AP)

Defensive tackles
 Dennis Randall, Oklahoma State (AP)
 Carel Stith, Nebraska (AP)

Middle guards
 Wayne Meylan, Nebraska (AP)

Linebackers
 Mike Sweatman, Kansas (AP)
 Danny Lankas, Kansas State (AP)

Defensive backs
 Eugene Ross, Oklahoma (AP)
 Jim Whitaker, Missouri (AP)
 Hale Irwin, Colorado (AP)
 Larry Wachholtz, Nebraska (AP)

Key
AP = Associated Press

See also
 1966 College Football All-America Team

References

All-Big Seven Conference football team
All-Big Eight Conference football teams